The Associated Press College Football Coach of the Year Award is an award that is given annually since 1998 to NCAA college football's national coach of the year. The award is voted on by the Associated Press (AP) voters that participate in the weekly college football AP Poll.  The current award holder is Sonny Dykes of the TCU for 2022.

Winners

Winners by school

References

External links
List of winners

College football coach of the year awards in the United States
Awards established in 1998
Associated Press awards